Flowing Gold may refer to:
 Flowing Gold, a 1922 novel by Rex Beach
 Flowing Gold (1924 film), an American silent drama film, based on the novel
 Flowing Gold (1940 film), an  American adventure film, based on the novel